"Strike to the Body" is a song by the American industrial rock group Die Warzau. It is the fifth single released in support of their debut album Disco Rigido.

Formats and track listing 
All songs written by Van Christie and Jim Marcus
US 12" single (YESX 2)
"Strike To The Body" (Funky Body Mix) – 4:34
"Strike To The Body" (Home Body Mix) – 5:00
"Strike To The Body" (Rubber Body Mix) – 4:49
"Strike To The Body" (Ampalang Mix) – 5:28

US 12" single (873 849)
"Strike To The Body" (Lil Louis' Body Blow Mix) – 7:08
"Strike To The Body" (Ampalang Mix) – 5:40
"Strike To The Body" (LP Mix) – 3:47
"Strike To The Body" (Modification Mix) – 6:20
"Strike To The Body" (Lil Louis' Body Blow Vocal Mix) – 3:50
"Jackhammer" (Remix) – 6:13

Charts

Personnel
Adapted from the Strike to the Body liner notes.

Die Warzau
 Van Christie – guitar, synthesizer, sampler, computer, production, editing
 Jim Marcus – lead vocals, saxophone, percussion, noises, production

Additional performers
 Lil Louis – remixing and additional production (A1, B2)

Production and design
 Steve Spapperi – production

Release history

References

External links 
 

1989 songs
1990 singles
Die Warzau songs
Fiction Records singles